The 1981 Afro-Arab Volleyball Friendship Cup was the first edition of the Afro-Arab Volleyball Friendship Cup. It was held in Kuwait City, Kuwait from 15 October to 25 October 1981.

Teams

Round robin

Final ranking

References

External links
 Tunisian national team titles (Tunisian Volleyball Federation)

Afro-Arab Volleyball Friendship Cup
1981 in Kuwaiti sport
1981 in volleyball
International volleyball competitions hosted by Kuwait